Bahrain Bay  is a residential and commercial district located on the main island of Bahrain (26°15'01.1"N 50°34'45.8"E),  (15 minutes) from Bahrain International Airport.

Description
Bahrain Bay is situated on coastal land adjacent to the original business and political area in the heart of Bahrain's capital city Manama. (Geographically, Bahrain as an island, sits in the center of the Persian Gulf and is connected by a bridged causeway to neighboring Saudi Arabia).
shallow waters which form the bay.

The project was designed by American firm Skidmore, Owings & Merrill, who also designed the Burj Khalifa, the world's tallest tower. The master plan was designed by then-SOM architect Michael Kirchmann, who explored the idea of concentric circles appearing as ripples from the central anchor structure.

Bahrain Bay offers spacious, state-of-the-art high-rise office and residential units along with major five-star hotels which are set in their own exclusive domains within the complex. Attractive landscaping has facilitated wide open public boulevards with waterfront recreational facilities and amenities which conveniently surround some of the tallest office buildings in Bahrain

Completed in 2012 and sporting several flyovers, Bahrain Bay is linked to the main multi-lane carriageways of the city by the purpose-built ‘North Manama Causeway’. This carriageway has wide exits and entrance ramps along its route which connect to the various areas of Bahrain Bay. The main road leads to the North and West highways at one end (Al Fateh Highway) and the nearby Bahrain Financial Harbor at the other. This junction also leads to the east and southbound routes (King Faisal Highway) and the old central Manama ‘souk’.

Although linked by roads and walkways, water taxis are also planned for shoppers wishing to visit other parts of Bahrain Bay or The Avenues mall, which is close by cross the bay.

Infrastructure 

October 2011 saw Bahrain bay taking shape and becoming a noticeable reality. A district cooling facility with chilled water connects to all land parcels.
Telecommunications facilities were channelled early in the project with fiber dominating the carrier. Any future requirements are well catered for with all current and future developments instantly connected with redundancy built in.

A 66 kV primary substation with five small 11 kV substations have been designed and constructed to power the entire project with redundancy built in. This and two sewerage pumping stations complete the utilities infrastructure.

As part of its development, Bahrain bay makes strenuous efforts to safeguard environmental well-being, both to a regional and international level. All third-party developers must strictly adhere to the vision in terms of construction, placing great importance on the aesthetic coherence and standard of quality. A full-time Technical Interface Office (TIO) manages current and future panning reviews, advising and ensuring compliance to the master plan as well as any governmental liaison or formal legal requirements such as licensing

Created by the reclamation of three islands – the north island, south island, and the Four Seasons central island – the development creates an inner harbor adjacent to the northern corniche of Manama. It is connected to the mainland by two multi-lane causeways, and encircled by a new ring road called the North Manama Causeway.
As part of the infrastructure, the project has built four 66 kV primary substations, five 11 kV substations, two potable water reservoirs, and two sewerage pumping stations.

A Public Venue

The Promenade is a wide waterfront walkway that partly encircles the island on which the Four Seasons Hotel is situated. A bridge connects the North and South islands of Bahrain Bay intersected by a water canal. In 2017 the Promenade was opened to the public as it hosted the second edition of Bahrain Food Festival; a three-week community event which set the scene for future events. Described by audiences and artists alike as a 'magnificent setting' Bahrain Bay has seen performances by several famous international names such as Sir Tom Jones, UB40, Omar Kamal and others. Each year, the 'Bahrain Spring of Culture festival' promotes several world-famous names across a wide genre of music and entertainment. This reputation, favored vast space with uncluttered access and parking, has already earned Bahrain Bay's Promenade its place as the go-to venue of choice. Bahrain Bay has also drawn the interest of visiting tourists aboard inbound cruise liners.

Anchor Developments 
There are two Anchor Developments to Bahrain Bay which form the cornerstones of the project:

Arcapita Group 

Arcapita an international investment manager and majority shareholder behind the project – has located their global corporate headquarters at Bahrain Bay.

Four Season Hotel 

The center-piece of Bahrain Bay is the Four Seasons hotel.

International Investors 

In addition to the three anchor developments, the list of third-party developers who have purchased land in the project include:

Al Baraka Banking Group – A global Islamic banking institution.

Ahmed AlQaed Group – A Bahrain-based integrated real-estate developer; building a 47-storey commercial tower.

Salhia Real Estate – A Kuwait-based real estate company specializing in high-end commercial property development.

Guidance Financial Group – An international finance firm dedicated to Sharia-compliant products and services; constructing a 240-room hotel complex set to host the 'Shaza' five-star hotel chain.

Ajmera Mayfair Realty Group – An India-based real estate firm; constructing a residential tower at Bahrain Bay.

Khaleej Capita – A Qatar-based investor is building a 45-storey mixed-use tower including a leading hotel global brand name.

Barwa Real Estate Group - A prominent property developer of Qatar; constructing a 240-room hotel complex set to host the 'Shaza' five-star hotel chain.

AXA insurance Gulf - One of the largest insurance companies in the Persian Gulf region; relocating their Regional Head Office.

Wafra Real Estate Group of Kuwait - The Wafra Tower; a landmark structure of unique design.

Damac – A Dubai-based real estate developer of private, residential, leisure and commercial projects; developing a residential tower project at Bahrain Bay.

Arjaan Rotana – A hotel and serviced apartments chain with over 70 properties across the Middle East; bringing their Arjaan serviced apartment brand to Bahrain Bay.

Ossis Property Developers – A Bahrain-based real estate developer; developing a flagship commercial and residential twin-tower project.

Other investors who are still finalizing the details of their individual projects include: Al Jomaih Investments;  Al Imtiaz; Al Oula; and Nama Real Estate.

Outset to Current Developments

Soon after reclamation, the International investment bank firm Arcapita was the first developer to commence building construction. Also designed by Skidmore, Owings & Merrill, the imposing predominantly glass Arcapita Headquarters is a unique rectangular structure which sits upon two low concrete arches which are described as ‘a sculptural plinth that represents rolling waves.’ As well as being the Arcapita Headquarters, the total office space of 18,500 sqm currently houses several prominent semi-governmental institutions which includes Bahrain Mumtalakat Holding Company, the Bahrain Tender Board, Osool, Amlak and the Economic Development Board of Bahrain.

In 2015 the Kingdom's first 68-floor Four Seasons Hotel was opened. It stands on its own island and is a towering ‘H shaped’ landmark with views from each of its 273 hotel rooms (including 57 suites).

Having decided to relocate its headquarters in 2016, the Al Baraka Banking Group purpose-built offices were completed. The building consists of two towers linked by a bridge, each 9 floors above ground, plus a mezzanine level. It has 4 levels of basement parking and ground level spaces. The Gross Development Area (GDA) is 38,540 sqm.
 
The second high-rise structure to open in 2017 is the United Tower, a twisting tower of which the lower 14 floors is due to house the 260 room Wyndham Grand Hotel. The spiral tower rises 50 floors in total with leased office space on the remaining 36 floors. As with all the structures in Bahrain Bay, the United Tower stands clear of other buildings and thus easily identified from distance.

The first construction of residential sections of Bahrain Bay also began in 2017, with the ‘Waterbay’ project, which is due for completion in 2018. 
This is one of the many luxury and prestigious developments Bin Faqih Real Estate company are committed to around the Island. The project consists of three unique buildings, each 10 stories high and each identical taking the shape of a ship's bow. The project will incorporate all amenities expected of high-end residences, such as a theatre, nursery, swimming pools and gyms. 
2017 also saw pilling worked commence for the new AXA Insurance Gulf Headquarters. A large internal atrium and terraces at each end is envisaged. The preliminary concept design has been prepared for AXA by Spanish Company Design Plus Art (DpA) and the Bahrain office of Italian company Enrico Mari Grego Architects (EMGA) has been appointed as Architect of Record and Design.
Other projects finalized with construction imminent are the Wafra Tower by Wafra Real Estate Group.

Golden Gates by Ajmera Mayfair Realty Group a joint venture between two Indian property houses Ajmera Group and Mayfair Housing and Rolex Tower by Nama International Real Estate.

Awards 
Bahrain Bay has won several awards since its inception, including two Arabian Commercial Property Awards in association with Bloomberg Television for Best Mixed Use Development Arabia and Best Mixed Use Development Bahrain in 2010. That year the project went on to be nominated in the Best Mixed-Use development global category. It received the International Arch of Europe by Business Initiative Directions in 2007 (a vanity award), and was nominated in the Master Plan Award category of the 2011 Cityscape Global Awards.

Administration
The island falls under the Capital Governorate.  Gagan Suri (42) is the chief executive officer of Bahrain Bay. www.bahrainbay.com

Transportation
There are two causeways connecting Bahrain Bay Islands with Manama on Bahrain Island.

Image gallery

References

External links 

Populated places in the Capital Governorate, Bahrain
Islands of Bahrain
Artificial islands of Bahrain
Islands of the Persian Gulf